Bugs is a 2003 American science-fiction-horror film that debuted as a Sci Fi Pictures TV-movie on the Sci Fi Channel on September 9, 2003. It starred Angie Everhart and Antonio Sabato Jr.

Plot
When a civil engineer (Antonio Sabato Jr.) retrieves a mysterious biological sample from a body discovered in a tunnel, an entomologist (Angie Everhart) discovers it is from a scorpion-like creature. Investigating, the two find themselves trapped in the tunnel with ravenous, flesh-eating bugs and must rely on the scientist's knowledge of the insect world in order to escape

Cast
 Antonio Sabato Jr. as Matt Pollack 
 Angie Everhart as Emily Foster 
 R.H. Thomson as Reynolds 
 Karl Pruner as Victor Petronovich 
 Duane Murray as Benton 
 Romano Orzari as Garcia 
 Stephanie Moore as Manning 
 Wes Williams as Bergstein (Wes "Maestro" Williams)
 Elias Zarou as Chief Lembeck
 Lynne Griffin as Medical Examiner
 Neil Foster as Dr. Franklin
 Tim Post as Jack Ball 
 Peter Kosaka as Mr. Yokoto
 Nigel Hamer as VIP Man 
 Nanci Steele as VIP Woman 
 Xuan Fraser as Beat Cop
 Dean Copkov as Cohen
 Tig Fong as Howsan
 Steve Lucescu as Porter

References

External links 
 

2003 horror films
2000s science fiction horror films
2003 television films
Syfy original films
American science fiction horror films
2003 films
American horror television films
2000s American films